Duthiers Point forms the south side of the entrance to Andvord Bay on the west coast of Graham Land. It was discovered by the Belgian Antarctic Expedition, 1897–99, under Gerlache, who named it "Cap Lacaze-Duthiers" for Félix Henri de Lacaze-Duthiers, a French naturalist and authority on the anatomy of mollusks.

References 

Headlands of Graham Land
Danco Coast